Alexandros Binas (born 6 January 1990) in Athens is a Greek footballer who plays for Thiella Agiou Dimitriou as midfielder.

External links
Onsports Profile
Myplayer Profile

References

1990 births
Living people
Footballers from Athens
Greek footballers
Association football midfielders